László Görög may refer to:

 László Görög (writer), American screenwriter
 László Görög (actor), Hungarian actor